Nizar is one of the 182 Legislative Assembly constituencies of Gujarat state in India. It is part of Tapi district and is reserved for candidates belonging to the Scheduled Tribes.

List of segments

This assembly seat represents the following segments,

 Nizar Taluka
 Uchchhal Taluka
 Songadh Taluka (Part) Villages – Rampura Kothar, Champavadi, Pokhran, Khambhala, Dosvada, Kumkuva, Rupvada, Chapaldhara, Raniamba, Balamrai, Gaisavar, Chimkuva, Tokarva (Segupada), Tokarva (Jamankuva), Kakad Kuva, Ghanchikuva, Khanjar, Kharsi, Devalpada, Kanala, Chorvad, Chikhli Khadka, Dhamodi, Junvan, Galkuva, Bedpada, Kanadevi, Rampura Kanadevi, Nana Bandharpada, Jharali, Nani Bhurvan, Medhsingi, Khokhsa, Kanji, Don, Moti Bhurvan, Hiravadi, Amba, Kukradungri, Kukadjhar, Vadpada P Tokarva, Ghodchit, Bandharpada, Gatadi, Tichakia, Hanmantiya, Mahudi, Monghvan, Maiyali, Sandhkuva, Tarsadi, Kakad Kuva P Umarda, Bedvan P Umarda, Vadpada P Umarda, Jamkhadi, Medha, Golan, Nana Tarpada, Ojhar, Hindla, Khadi, Sadadvel, Bharadada, Gopalpura, Vanjhafali, Amalgundi, Chakvan, Borkuva, Kalaghat, Mota Satsila, Ghodi Ruvali, Ghuntvel, Vadda P Umarda, Taparvada, Gunkhadi, Temka, Masanpada, Dardi, Umarda, Dhanmauli, Amthava, Shravaniya, Lavchali, Chimer, Kanti, Seljhar, Borpada, Khogal Gam, Mota Tarpada, Kapad Bandh, Siraspada, Vadirupgadh, Chikhalapada, Khapatia, Mohpada(Malangdev), Virthava, Ekva Golan, Malangdev, Karvanda, Langad, Ghusargam, Bhorthava, Otta, Rasmati, Pahadada, Mal, Sadadun, Sinand, Songadh (M)

Members of Legislative Assembly

Election results

2022

2017

2012

See also
 List of constituencies of Gujarat Legislative Assembly
 Gujarat Legislative Assembly

References

External links
 

Assembly constituencies of Gujarat
Tapi district